Martyn Smith (born 27 February 1992)is an English professional rugby league footballer who plays for RC Lescure-Arthes XIII in the Elite Two Championship, as a  or .

Background
Martyn Smith was born in Mitcham, London, England.

Playing career
Smith made his first grade début in the Super League, aged just 17 for the Harlequins RL against Hull F.C. on 26 February 2010.

He has represented England in Australian Rules Football.

References

External links
Harlequins Rugby League profile
Quins squad packed with home-grown talent
YOUNGSTER SET FOR QUINS DÉBUT

1992 births
Living people
English players of Australian rules football
English rugby league players
London Broncos players
London Skolars players
People from Mitcham
RC Lescure-Arthes XIII players
Rugby league halfbacks
Rugby league players from Greater London